St. Andre Bessette Catholic Secondary School is a Catholic secondary school in London, Ontario, Canada administered by the London District Catholic School Board (LDCSB). It is the most recent high school to be built in the LDCSB, the last one being Mother Teresa Catholic Secondary School in 2000.

History

Construction of St. Andre Bessette started in 2012. The school was built as a means to relieve schools that were over capacity, such as St. Thomas Aquinas and Mother Teresa, as well as to remove all portable classrooms from each high school. The construction of St. Andre Bessette resulted in the closure of 50 portable classrooms. The school opened in September 2013 for students in grades 9 and 10, with a student body of about 300 students. The first graduating class graduated in June 2016.

Facilities
As the newest secondary school, it is equipped with new technology throughout the school. The school cost $27 million to build, and totals 135,000 square feet. The school is completely wireless, and trying to be paperless. The main staircase is used as a hangout for the students, with plugs built in it. Some of the specialty classrooms include a health-care technology course, an exercise room, dance studio, music, arts, drama room, etc.

St. Andre Bessette offers students over 30 different clubs and extracurricular activities to choose from, including hockey, an anime club, archery, a recycling club, and a photography club. The academic agenda includes courses from The Arts, Business Studies, Canadian and World Studies, Cooperative Education, English, French, Social Studies and Humanities, Religion, Computer Studies, Health and Physical Education, Mathematics, Science, Technological Education, and several e-Learning classes.

Feeder schools

All Students:
St. Thomas More Catholic School
St. Marguerite D'Youville Catholic School
St. Patrick Catholic School, Lucan

Some Students:
St. Catherine Of Siena Catholic School
Notre Dame Catholic School
St. Paul Catholic School
Our Lady Of Lourdes Catholic School, Delaware

See also
List of secondary schools in Ontario

References

External links

 St. Andre Bessette
 London District Catholic School Board

Education in London, Ontario
Catholic secondary schools in Ontario
Buildings and structures in London, Ontario
Educational institutions established in 2013
2013 establishments in Ontario